Nauti FC is a Tuvalu football club from Funafuti, playing in the Tuvalu A-Division.

The team's home ground is the Tuvalu Sports Ground, the only football field in Tuvalu. Nauti is one of the most successful teams in Tuvalu, with the most trophies of all the nation's teams. Nauti plays on an amateur level, as do all the teams in Tuvalu. They also have a reserve squad and a women's team.

History
Nauti was founded in 1980, under the name Combined Devils. The name was initiated by Mr Igatia Talesi. In 1976, he started a mixed team of men from Funafuti and other Tuvalu Islands with the name Combined Devils.

It was in 1980, that Nauti/Combined Devils was officially recognised as the Funafuti Soccer Team. The team's first red uniform was sponsored by Kamuta Latasi. Years later, the team is still using the red color uniforms, the patterns varies but remains red and white.
Nauti won the independence Cup in 1988, it was the first prize won by the team and also in 1990 and 1999. In 2001 the name of the team was changed into Nauti FC.

During 1980–1990 the team was never defeated by Vaitupu, Nukulaelae, Naumaga, Nui or the Tuvalu police Team. It was only defeated once by Nukufetau (penalty kicks in 1982) once by Nanumea and once by Nuitao (Knock out tournaments). In the League Tournament Nauti was never defeated in the period 1980–1990.
In 1991 the airfield was tar-sealed and soccer tournaments in the capital Funafuti came to a standstill. Soccer games were first played again in 1997.

Nauti played several finales for the Independence Cup. They won the cup in 2003, 2008 and 2009. Nauti is the most successful club in Tuvalu, having won the most titles in the Tuvalu A-Division of all the teams in Tuvalu.
The Tuvalu A-Division was formed in 2001. Nauti won their first A-Division title in 2005. From 2007 on they won the league seven times in a row. 2009 was the most successful year for Nauti FC, winning a total of three trophy's.

Current squad

Nauti B

Honours

League
Tuvalu A-Division
Winners (15): 2000,2005, 2007, 2008, 2009, 2010, 2011, 2012, 2013, 2014, 2015, 2016, 2019, 2020, 2022

Cup

Independence Cup
Winners (7): 1988, 1990, 1999, 2003, 2008, 2009, 2017
Runners-up (5): 1998, 2004, 2007, 2012, 2013
NBT Cup
Winners (3): 2009, 2010, 2016
Tuvalu Games
Runners-up (2): 2010, 2013
Christmas Cup
Runners-up (1): 2011

See also
 Nauti Women

References

External links
 vriendenvantuvalu.nl
 tnfa.tv

Funafuti
Football clubs in Tuvalu
1980 establishments in Tuvalu
Association football clubs established in 1980